Marcin Sasal (born 22 December 1970 in Skarżysko-Kamienna) is a Polish football manager and former footballer.

References

External links
  Nigdy nie odpuszczam Korona Kielce
 Marcin Sasal – przedstawienie szkoleniowca MKS Korona Kielce
 

1970 births
Living people
People from Skarżysko County
Sportspeople from Świętokrzyskie Voivodeship
Polish footballers
Association football goalkeepers
Legionovia Legionowo players
Polish football managers
Ząbkovia Ząbki managers
Korona Kielce managers
Pogoń Szczecin managers
Podbeskidzie Bielsko-Biała managers
Motor Lublin managers
MKP Pogoń Siedlce managers
Legionovia Legionowo managers
KSZO Ostrowiec Świętokrzyski managers